Shubham Rohilla (born 10 March 1998) is an Indian cricketer. He made his first-class debut for Haryana in the 2014–15 Ranji Trophy on 29 January 2015. He made his Twenty20 debut for Haryana in the 2016–17 Inter State Twenty-20 Tournament on 29 January 2017.

He made his List A debut for Haryana in the 2016–17 Vijay Hazare Trophy on 25 February 2017. Four days later, he scored his maiden List A century in the Vijay Hazare Trophy match against Assam.

He is an opener from Haryana Ranji team.

References

External links
 

1998 births
Living people
Indian cricketers
Haryana cricketers
People from Rohtak